Walloping Wallace is a 1924 American silent Western film directed by Norbert A. Myles and starring Buddy Roosevelt, Violet La Plante and Lew Meehan.

Cast
 Buddy Roosevelt as Buddy Wallace 
 Violet La Plante as Carol Grey 
 Lew Meehan as Squinty Burnt 
 N.E. Hendrix as Shorty 
 Lillian Gale as Ma Fagin 
 Terry Myles as Spud 
 Olin Francis as Sheriff 
 Dick Bodkins as Cattle buyer

References

Bibliography
 Goble, Alan. The Complete Index to Literary Sources in Film. Walter de Gruyter, 1999.

External links
 

1924 films
1924 Western (genre) films
American black-and-white films
Silent American Western (genre) films
1920s English-language films
1920s American films